Jordan High School could be one of several high schools, including:

 Barbara Jordan High School, Houston, Texas
 Jordan High School (Fulshear, Texas)
 Charles E. Jordan High School, Durham, North Carolina
 East Jordan High School, East Jordan, Michigan
 Jordan-Elbridge High School, Jordan, New York
 Jordan High School (Jordan, Minnesota), Jordan, Minnesota
 Jordan High School (Long Beach, California), Long Beach, California
 Jordan High School (Los Angeles, California), Watts, Los Angeles, California
 Jordan High School (Sandy, Utah), Sandy, Utah
 Jordan Matthews High, Siler City, North Carolina
 Jordan Resource Center, Midvale, Utah
 Jordan Secondary Learning Center, Garden Grove, California
 Jordan Valley High School, Jordan Valley, Oregon
 Jordan Valley School, Midvale, Utah
 Jordan Vocational High School, Columbus, Georgia
 Mortimer Jordan High School, Morris, Alabama
 West Jordan High School, West Jordan, Utah